"With All My Might" is a song recorded by Canadian country music artist George Fox. It was released in 1990 as the fourth single from his second studio album, With All My Might. It peaked at number 5 on the RPM Country Tracks chart in March 1991.

Chart performance

Year-end charts

References

1989 songs
1990 singles
George Fox songs
Warner Music Group singles
Songs written by George Fox (singer)